Lifeline is the seventh studio album by Neal Morse. The album features performances from Mike Portnoy (ex-Dream Theater) on drums and Randy George (Ajalon) on bass, as well as special guest appearances including Paul Bielatowicz on guitar and Paul Gilbert (Racer X and Mr. Big), who features on a bonus cut. Live drummer Collin Leijenaar plays on the bonus track "Set the Kingdom".

Neal and his band first performed the title track, Lifeline, live at the Night of the Prog Festival on the Loreley, Germany. It was also played at a concert in Trondheim, Norway, with a local band.

It was later announced that the album would be released on October 1, 2008. Unlike many of his previous releases, Lifeline is not a concept album.

Track listing
All songs written by Neal Morse except where noted.

A special edition was released with a CD of bonus material, including covers of four "pretty cool songs by pretty uncool bands" as well as two original songs. "Set the Kingdom" actually ends at 11:00 and is followed by silence before the hidden track.

Reception

Unlike the majority of Morse's work, reception for the album has been mixed to positive.

Radu Catrina of The Dwarf found it to be "an abrupt drop in quality" from what he considered previous excellent releases, and refers to Lifeline as "a descent into the often mind-numbing abyss of Christian rock".

According to Neal Morse's official website, TheProgFiles.com reportedly wrote: "Hands down, nobody in the industry does prog better than Neal Morse."

Personnel

 Band
 Neal Morse — keyboards, guitars, vocals
 Mike Portnoy — drums
 Randy George — bass

 Special guests
 Paul Gilbert — lead guitar on "Crazy Horses"
 Paul Bielatowicz — lead guitar on "Lemons" and second guitar solo on "Fly High"
 Collin Leijenaar — drums on "Set the Kingdom"
 Carl Groves — backing vocals on "Lifeline", "The Way Home", "Children of the Chosen" and "So Many Roads"
 Jonathan Willis — strings on "The Way Home", "Eyes of the Saviour" and "Fly High"
 Jim Hoke — saxophone on "Leviathan" and "The Humdrum Life"
 Ivory Leonard and Danielle Spencer — backing vocals on "So Many Roads"

Technical personnel
 Rich Mouser - mixing

References

Neal Morse albums
2008 albums